Na Chom Thian or Na Jomtien is a town and tambon (subdistrict) in Sattahip District of Chon Buri Province, on the southern fringe of Pattaya. It is known for its attractions Nong Nooch Tropical Garden, Wat Yanasangwararam, Buddha Mountain (Khao Chi Chan), natural parks and sandy beaches.

Geography 
The subdistrict of Na Chom Thian is bordered by Na Kluea and Huai Yai subdistricts (parts of which are occupied by the city of Pattaya) in Bang Lamung District to the north, Samnak Thon Subdistrict in Ban Chang District, Rayong Province to the east, and Phlu Ta Luang and Bang Sare subdistricts, also in Sattahip District, to the south. The region has a group of small, isolated mountains to the east and southeast and borders the Gulf of Thailand to the west. The coast is defined by Ban Amphur Beach, which continues south from Pattaya's Jomtien Beach.

The western part of the subdistrict falls under the local government of Na Chom Thain Subdistrict Municipality (thesaban tambon), while the non-municipal areas are administered by the Na Chom Thian Subdistrict Administrative Organization.

Places of Interest 

The Nong Nooch Tropical Garden, a popular tourist destination in Thailand for its exhibition of Cycads from Tropical Asia, South America and Central Africa regions, is located in Na Chom Thian. The adjacent limestone hill, the 'Big Buddha Mountain' (Khao Chi Chan) with a large  engraved Buddha image, attracts people on an international level. Other gems nearby such as the Royal Chinese temple Viharnra Sien, the 'National Wildlife Park' and the Buddhist temple Wat Yanasangwararam or Wat Yan with its small parks offer space for walking and relaxing in a green setting. Wat Yan was under the auspices of His Royal Majesty Bhumibol Adulyadej.

Closer to the coast is the Ramayana Water Park, one of the largest water theme parks in Thailand. It is the site of numerous skyscrapers, hotel, residential and resort developments.  There are seafood restaurants and cozy coffee houses to the left and right of Sukhumvit Road. The 'Rimpa Lapin', 'Pattaya Glass House' and 'Mimosa Pattaya' near the 'Ambassador City Jomtien' are some of the most famous. Closer to Pattaya the 'Tiger Park' and 'Pattaya Floating Market' serve as tourist attractions.

References

Populated places in Chonburi province
Sattahip District
Beaches of Thailand